Pawan Kumar (born 2 March 1969) is an Indian former cricketer. He played twenty-one first-class matches for Tripura between 1991 and 1999.

References

External links
 

1969 births
Living people
Indian cricketers
Tripura cricketers
Cricketers from Patna